Richard J. Coar (May 2, 1921 – December 29, 2013), an aeronautical engineer, was a member of the United States National Academy of Engineering, elected in 1984.
The American Society of Mechanical Engineers honored him with the George Westinghouse Medal in 1984, and in 1998 he received the Daniel Guggenheim Medal.
 
He received a bachelor's degree from Tufts College in 1942. He is known for helping develop the model 304 liquid hydrogen aircraft engine, and the RL10 rocket engine. He later served as Executive Vice President at Pratt & Whitney.

His son, Ken, is well known for his involvement of the launch of the Apache Foundation, a United States-based non-profit software development company.

References

American aerospace engineers
1921 births
2013 deaths
Tufts University School of Engineering alumni
Members of the United States National Academy of Engineering